The 2004 Welsh local elections took place on 10 June 2004 to elect members of all twenty-two local authorities in Wales. They were held alongside other local elections in the United Kingdom. The previous elections were held in 1999.

The elections were originally scheduled for May 2003, but were delayed to avoid a conflict with the 2003 Wales Assembly elections. However, this meant they took place on the same day as the 2004 elections to the European Parliament. 3,135 candidates competed for 1,262 council seats across Wales, in 879 electoral wards.

Results

Councils

In all 22 Welsh councils the whole of the council was up for election.

Notes

References

External links

 
2004 elections in the United Kingdom
2004 United Kingdom local elections
June 2004 events in the United Kingdom